The 2026 Commonwealth Games, officially known as the XXIII Commonwealth Games and commonly known as Victoria 2026, is a multi-sport event for members of the Commonwealth scheduled to take place across four regional sites in the Australian state of Victoria: Geelong, Bendigo, Ballarat and Gippsland. The opening ceremonies will be held in the state capital Melbourne at the Melbourne Cricket Ground and the closing ceremonies will be held at the Kardinia Park in Geelong. In a departure from previous Commonwealth Games, the event will not be held in one major city but will be hosted by the state and held across a number of regional cities outside the capital. The Games will take place over twelve days between 17 and 29 March 2026.

The 2026 Commonwealth Games will be the first to be held since the death of Queen Elizabeth II and the accession of King Charles III as Head of the Commonwealth on 8 September 2022.

The host city was initially intended to be selected at the 2019 Commonwealth Games Federation (CGF) General Assembly in Kigali, Rwanda. On 16 June 2019, the CGF confirmed that it would decide the host city in 2020, but the lack of interest from cities and the COVID-19 pandemic delayed the announcement. In December 2021, the CGF reported that it would announce a host some time in March 2022; however, Victoria was announced as the host on 12 April 2022, after two months of an exclusive dialogue process with the CGF.

Host selection 

During the CGF General Assembly on 31 March 2017 in Gold Coast, after the troubled 2022 Commonwealth Games host city bid process, the executive board announced that it had planned to award both 2026 and 2030 Commonwealth Games simultaneously at the CGF General Assembly scheduled for Kigali, Rwanda in September 2019. A new model called CGF Partnerships (CGFP) was implemented. This aims to give stronger support to the associations and cities that show interests in hosting future Games, and enhance the overall value of the event. This is similar to the process used by the International Olympic Committee (IOC) since 2017. In January 2022 the Victorian State Government announced it was giving serious consideration to a late request from the CGF to host the Games. On 16 February 2022, Premier of Victoria Daniel Andrews confirmed that the state was in exclusive negotiations with the CGF to host the Games. It was stated that if successful in hosting the Games a second time, a Victorian bid would aim to emphasise the state's regional centres—such as Geelong, Ballarat and Bendigo—as opposed to being predominantly Melbourne-based, such as in 2006. Bendigo had previously hosted the 2004 Commonwealth Youth Games. Acceptance of the bid will likely also be conditional upon agreement on ways to control costs, such as housing athletes and officials in hotels rather than a dedicated village. This bid was confirmed as successful on 12 April 2022.

Development and preparations 

In May 2022 the Victorian State Government allocated $2.6 billion to deliver the Commonwealth Games in the years leading to 2026. This money will be used to build housing, infrastructure and athletes hubs in each of the four regional sites. The Andrews Government said that the priority was to use existing facilities as much as possible, with spending concentrated on supporting infrastructure. The games are to be held in March to avoid clashes with the Australian Football League calendar in Melbourne. In June 2022, the State Government announced Jeroen Weimar had been appointed chief executive of the 2026 Games organising committee. Weimar is a public servant who rose to prominence as the state's COVID-19 Commander in charge of the pandemic response, and had previously served as the CEO of Public Transport Victoria.

Venue construction and renovations 

While details are being released in relation to venue construction and upgrades for the games, all sports have been consolidated along with their locations. On 12 October 2022 the State Government announced a $150 million (AUD) upgrade to Eureka Stadium and its surrounds. Eureka Stadium upgrades will include expansion of permanent seating from 5,300 to 10-11,000 after the Games, upgrading of the lighting, and the installation of 18,000 temporary seats. Other upgrades to the precinct will include the addition of a nearby permanent athletics track.

In Geelong, the City Hall has identified the construction of a new indoor arena to host the gymnastics and table tennis events as a "priority project". Additionally, the Geelong deputy mayor Trent Sullivan has hinted at several possible venues for the Games, including using Eastern Beach as a venue for triathlon and beach volleyball, the newly redeveloped Kardinia Park for cricket T20, and new or upgraded facilities to host aquatics. In July 2022 the state government announced that Stead Park in Corio, a suburb of Geelong, would be upgraded to host the hockey events and have a capacity of 15,000 using a mix of permanent and temporary seating. It is to receive two new international-standard hockey pitches and is planned to become the state's premier field hockey facility. Shepparton will also host some cycling events.

A temporary pop-up velodrome will be installed at the Bendigo Showgrounds and shooting is also to be competed in Bendigo.

Infrastructure 

It is expected that the Midland Highway, which links four host cities (Geelong, Ballarat, Bendigo and Shepparton) will receive upgrades in time for the games, with the possibility of a new northern train station to be constructed in Ballarat adjacent to Eureka Stadium.

An athlete's village will be built in the four host cities, with the villages to be converted to social and affordable housing after the Games. Village locations have been confirmed for the former Saleyards site in Ballarat, at Flora Hill in Bendigo and at Morwell in Gippsland.

Sports 

Under new rules designed to encourage cities to bid for the Commonwealth Games, the CGF required only two sports must be played in future Games: athletics and swimming. Despite this, sixteen sports were agreed to for the 2026 Victorian Games, with a further seven the subject of discussion between the governing bodies and the Victorian Government. The list includes T20 cricket, for which a women's tournament was held at Birmingham 2022, alongside the following: swimming and diving, athletics, badminton, boxing, beach volleyball, cycling, gymnastics, hockey, lawn bowls, netball, rugby sevens, squash, table tennis, triathlon and weightlifting. In April 2022, the Indian Olympic Association demanded that the 2026 Games also include archery, shooting and wrestling. In July 2022 the State Government announced that they opened an expressions of interest process for the inclusion of sports beyond the initial 16 planned.

The final list of sports was announced in October 2022, with the addition of 3x3 Basketball, 3x3 Wheelchair Basketball, Shooting, Shooting Para Sport, Mountain Bike Cross Country, Track Cycling and Para Cycling Track added, along with the debut at Commonwealth Games of coastal rowing, golf and BMX. There will be a total of 21 sports and 26 disciplines, of which ten are fully integrated Para sports. Judo, wrestling and rhythmic gymnastics were dropped after featuring in the 2022 Games.

 Aquatics
 
  
  
 
 
 
 
 
 
 
 
  
 
 
 
 
  
  
 * 
 
 
  
 
  
 
  
  
 
 (Demonstration Sport)

Venues 

Venues will mostly be located within Geelong, Bendigo, Ballarat, Gippsland and the Shepparton region. Melbourne will host the opening ceremonies, acting as a gateway to the four main regional athletics sites and the closing ceremonies are scheduled for Kardinia Park in Geelong. The current list is open to change, and further venues are to be named in late 2022. The Victorian State Budget on 3 May 2022 allocated overall funding for the Games but planning work for the redevelopment of venues is ongoing.

Ballarat hub 

 Ballarat Sports Events Centre, Wendouree – Boxing
 Creswick trails, Creswick – Mountain Biking
 Eureka Stadium, Wendouree – Athletics and Street Events (Marathon and Walking Starts and Finishes).

Bendigo hub 

 Bendigo Bowls Club, Bendigo – Lawn Bowls
 Bendigo Showgrounds, North Bendigo – Table Tennis, Track Cycling 
 Bendigo Stadium, West Bendigo – Netball
 Venue TBA – 3x3 Basketball
 Venue TBA – Squash

Geelong hub 

 Eastern Beach, Geelong – Beach Volleyball and Triathlon
 Kardinia Park, South Geelong – Cricket T20 (finals), Closing Ceremonies
 Stead Park, Corio – Hockey
 New Aquatics Centre to be constructed, Armstrong Creek – Aquatics (Swimming and Diving)
 New arena to be constructed, Waurn Ponds – Gymnastics, Para Powerlifting and Weightlifting
 Venue TBA, Bellarine Peninsula – Golf
 Venue TBA, Torquay – Coastal Rowing

Gippsland hub 

 Gippsland Regional Indoor Sports Stadium, Traralgon – Badminton
 Latrobe City Stadium, Morwell – Rugby Sevens
 Ted Summerton Reserve, Moe – Cricket T20
 Traralgon town centre – Road Cycling
 Venue TBA – Shooting

Melbourne 

Melbourne Cricket Ground, Richmond – Opening Ceremonies

Shepparton 

 Shepparton BMX Club, Shepparton – BMX
 Venue TBA – Road Cycling

Athletes villages

 Ballarat – Ballarat Saleyards
 Bendigo – Flora Hill
 Geelong – Waurn Ponds 
 Gippsland – Morwell

Ceremonies

Opening ceremony

The opening ceremony will take place on 17 March 2026 at the Melbourne Cricket Ground.

Closing ceremony

The closing ceremony will take place on 29 March 2026 at Kardinia Park, and the Commonwealth Games Federation flag will be handed over to the representatives of the 2030 Commonwealth Games, which will be known as the Centenary Games.

Broadcasting 

  – Sky Television

References

External links
Victoria 2026 - Victorian Government
Official Twitter handle

Commonwealth Games by year
Commonwealth Games 2026
2026 in multi-sport events